The Philippines is scheduled to compete at the 2017 World Aquatics Championships in Budapest, Hungary from 14 July to 30 July.

Swimming

The Philippines has received a Universality invitation from FINA to send a maximum of four swimmers (two men and two women) to the World Championships.

Synchronized swimming

The Philippines' synchronized swimming team consisted of 3 athletes (3 female).

Women

References

Nations at the 2017 World Aquatics Championships
Philippines at the World Aquatics Championships
2017 in Philippine sport